HMS Jasper was a British Algerine-class gunboat launched in 1857.

History
HMS Jasper was launched on 18 March 1857. It was commissioned on 28 July under Lieut. William Henry Pym and served in the North America and West Indies Station. Emilia was towed to Port Royal by Jasper. The capture of a US vessel ignited a diplomatic crisis between Great Britain and the United States, though it was later resolved when Great Britain agreed not to search US vessels.

On 2 August 1862, Jasper was purchased by Horatio Nelson Lay, Inspector General of the Qing Dynasty Chinese Maritime Customs Service, as part of an effort to bolster the Qing Dynasty naval force in response to the ongoing Taiping Rebellion. Thereafter she was renamed Amoy, and became part of the Lay-Osborn Flotilla commanded by Sherard Osborn. She was put under the command of Lieut. Arthur Salwey, and sailed for China in April 1863. Upon her arrival in Tientsin, the Qing government ordered the ship to be renamed as Kuang Wan.

Disagreements between the Qing government and Lay over the command and composition of the Lay-Osborn Flotilla led to its disbandment in 1863, and Amoy was taken to Bombay by Osborn, presumably for sale. There are conflicting accounts of her fate. She was possibly sold to Egypt on 30 December 1865, or to Captain Charles Stuart Forbes of Keangsoo. One Chinese source indicated that it was eventually sold to Satsuma Domain with Keangsoo.

Citations

References

 
 
 
 
 
 
 

 

Algerine-class gunboats
Victorian-era sloops of the United Kingdom
1857 ships
Ships built by the Blackwall Yard
Naval ships of Imperial China
Naval ships of China
Gunboats of China